The men's Laser is a sailing event on the Sailing at the 2020 Summer Olympics program in Tokyo that takes place between 25 July–1 August at Kamakura. 11 races (the last one a medal race) are scheduled.

Medals were presented by IOC Member for Cuba Mrs Maria de la Caridad Colon Ruenes and World Sailing Chief Executive Officer David Graham.

Schedule

Results

References 

Men's Laser
Men's events at the 2020 Summer Olympics